Saint-Nicolas tram stop is located on line B of the Tramway de Bordeaux, and served as terminus of that line between 24 April 2004, when the line opened, and 3 July 2004, when the line was extended to Bougnard. The stop is located in the commune of Bordeaux and is operated by Transports Bordeaux Métropole.

For most of the day on Mondays to Fridays, trams run at least every five minutes in both directions through the tram stop.

Close by
 Argonne
 Église Saint-Nicolas

References

External links
 

Bordeaux tramway stops
Tram stops in Bordeaux
Railway stations in France opened in 2004